Ice Age: Dawn of the Dinosaurs is a 2009 American computer-animated adventure comedy film produced by Blue Sky Studios and distributed by 20th Century Fox. It is the sequel to Ice Age: The Meltdown (2006) and the third installment in the Ice Age film series. It was directed by Carlos Saldanha. Ray Romano, John Leguizamo, Denis Leary, and Chris Wedge reprise their roles from the first two films and Seann William Scott, Josh Peck, and Queen Latifah reprise their roles from The Meltdown, with Simon Pegg joining them in the role of a weasel named Buck. The story has Sid the Sloth being kidnapped by a female Tyrannosaurus after stealing her eggs, leading the rest of the herd to rescue him in a tropical lost world inhabited by dinosaurs underneath the ice.

The film was released on July 1, 2009, becoming the first Ice Age film and the first 20th Century Fox film to be released in 3D. It received mixed reviews from critics, and has grossed $886.7 million worldwide, making it the third-highest-grossing film of 2009, the highest-grossing animated film of 2009, the highest-grossing Ice Age film and the highest-grossing film from Blue Sky Studios. Two sequels, Ice Age: Continental Drift and Ice Age: Collision Course, were released in 2012 and 2016, respectively.

Plot

A year after the events of the second film, Ellie is pregnant, making Manny excited and overprotective. However, this causes him to become distant and negligent of Diego, who debates whether he should leave the herd because he thinks that he's losing his edge as a hunter and isn't meant for the family life, and Sid, who begins to wish for a family of his own and adopts three apparently lost eggs that he finds in a cave. Manny tells Sid to put the eggs back, but Sid ignores him and looks after them, which hatch into baby Tyrannosaurus rex the next morning. The dinosaurs think Sid is their mother and follow him everywhere. Meanwhile, Scrat becomes infatuated with a flying saber-tooth squirrel named Scratte, though during a squabble over an acorn, they both fall off a cliff.

Although Sid tries his best to raise the dinosaurs, their rambunctious behavior scares away all the younger animals and ruins the playground Manny built for his child, angering Manny. Not long after, the Tyrannosaurus whose eggs Sid stole, known as Momma Dino, returns. When Sid refuses to return the babies, she carries both Sid and her children underground, with Diego in pursuit. Manny, Ellie, Crash, and Eddie follow as well and discover that the icy cave leads to a vast subterranean jungle populated by dinosaurs thought to be extinct. There, they meet a deranged, quick-witted, one-eyed least weasel named Buck when he saves them from a crowd of angry, carnivorous dinosaurs surrounding them.

Buck reveals that he has been living in this jungle for quite some time and is hunting down Rudy, a large and hostile albino Baryonyx feared by the inhabitants of the jungle, intending to avenge the eye he lost to him years prior. He agrees to lead the group through the jungle's perils to Lava Falls, where Momma has taken Sid and her babies. In the meantime, Scrat and Scratte continue their battle for the acorn back, but during one of their fights, Scrat saves Scratte from falling into a river of lava, causing them to fall in love with each other and forget about the acorn. Meanwhile, Momma tries to eat Sid, but her babies protect him, still thinking he is their mother. Afterwards, Momma, realizing that her children genuinely care for Sid, warms up to him. The next day, however, Sid is separated from the Tyrannosaurus family and is attacked by Rudy. He is knocked onto a loose rock slab that is floating on a river of lava and about to plummet over the falls.

As the herd moves toward the lava falls, Ellie goes into labor and a pack of Guanlong attack them, causing a rock slide that separates her from the rest. Buck, Crash, and Eddie set out to rescue Sid while Manny and Diego stay behind to protect Ellie. Diego regains his edge by protecting Ellie from the Guanlong closest to her while supporting her emotionally as she gives birth, while Manny slows down the ones further away as he makes his way up to her. Meanwhile, just as Sid goes over the falls, Buck, Crash, and Eddie swoop in on a commandeered Harpactognathus, narrowly saving Sid after escaping a pack of Quetzalcoatlus. Manny reaches Ellie just in time to hear the cry of a newborn baby girl. The couple agree to name the baby "Peaches". Sid is happy to reunite with his friends, but gets sad at the fact that he never had a chance to say goodbye to the dinosaurs. 

Before they can leave the jungle, they are ambushed by Rudy. Working together, Manny, Sid, Diego, and Buck manage to trap Rudy by ensnaring him in vines. However, he quickly breaks free and resumes his onslaught. The herd is saved by Momma, who charges at Rudy and knocks him off a cliff, where he falls to his presumed death. Sid then says goodbye to the dinosaurs, while Momma acknowledges him as their father figure. Having realized that Momma is their real mother, the babies follow her as she leaves. Buck, now without a purpose in life since Rudy is gone, decides to join the herd and live on the surface. However, a distant roar tells him that Rudy is still alive. Because of this, he changes his mind and sends the herd home, blocking off the path to the underground jungle. Manny and Ellie welcome Peaches into their frozen world and Manny admits to Sid that he was a good father to the baby dinosaurs. Diego decides to remain with the herd, while Buck stays underground, happily battling with Rudy. Meanwhile, Scrat and Scratte decide to live in the jungle together. However, Scrat ultimately chooses the acorn over her. The two battle once more for the acorn, which results in Scrat being accidentally launched back to the surface while Scratte falls back in the dinosaur world, making it her new home. Scrat taunts her about the acorn, but once again loses it after a large piece of ice knocks it out of his hands, much to his frustration.

Cast

 Ray Romano as Manny, a woolly mammoth and the leader of The Herd. He is also Ellie's husband, Sid and Diego's best friend and Peaches' father.
 John Leguizamo as Sid, a ground sloth and the founder of The Herd. He is also Manny and Diego's best friend and the adoptive father of the three baby dinos.
 Denis Leary as Diego, a Smilodon and a member of The Herd and Manny and Sid's best friend.
 Simon Pegg as Buck, a one-eyed least weasel and a dinosaur hunter who joins The Herd.
 Queen Latifah as Ellie, a female woolly mammoth, Manny's wife, Peaches' mother and Crash and Eddie's foster sister.
 Seann William Scott as Crash, an opossum, Eddie's biological brother and Ellie's foster brother.
 Josh Peck as Eddie, an opossum, Crash's biological brother and Ellie's foster brother.
 Tara Strong as Peaches, Manny and Ellie's first child.
 Chris Wedge as Scrat, a saber-toothed squirrel.
 Karen Disher as Scratte, a female saber-toothed squirrel, and Scrat's former love interest
 Frank Welker as Momma and Rudy
 Bill Hader as Gazelle
 Jane Lynch as Diatryma Mom
 Kristen Wiig as Pudgy Beaver Mom
 Carlos Saldanha as Dinosaur Babies / Flightless Bird
 Eunice Cho as Madison (Diatryma Girl)
 Maile Flanagan as Aardvark Mom
 Christian Pikes as Little Johnny, an aardvark
 Clea Lewis as Start Mom
 Devika Parikh (additional voices)

Production
Blue Sky decided to do "more of a what-if adventure" in the third Ice Age installment, "like finding the giant ape in King Kong or a Shangri-la in the middle of snow," and added the dinosaurs to the story. Character designer Peter de Sève welcomed the new plot addition, since he could not think of any other giant mammal to put into the story. The "lost world" approach led to colorful dinosaurs, because "the dinosaurs didn't have to be just brown, and you can take liberties because no one knows what color they were", according to de Sève. Rudy's design was inspired by the Baryonyx because of his crocodile-like look, which de Sève considered even more menacing than the T. rex.

Release
Ice Age: Dawn of the Dinosaurs held special screenings on Father's Day, June 21, 2009, in 330 theaters across the United States, exclusively in 3-D. That day was chosen due to the film featuring a theme of fatherhood. Widely, it was released on July 1, 2009.

The film was released in RealD 3D where available. This sparked some controversy when Fox announced that it would no longer pay to supply 3-D glasses to theaters, leading to a number of exhibitors threatening to show the film in only standard 2-D projection.

Home media
Ice Age: Dawn of the Dinosaurs was released on standard DVD and high-definition Blu-ray Disc in North America on October 27, 2009. Two versions of the DVD were released: a single-disc DVD, and a "Scrat Pack" double DVD pack with three Scrat games. The 3-disc Blu-ray combo pack included a Blu-ray, the single-disc DVD, and a Digital Copy, as well as an Ice Age digital story-book maker, commentary by director Carlos Saldanha, deleted scenes, making-of featurettes, the two Scrat shorts: Gone Nutty and No Time for Nuts (that each originally came on home video for both the first and second films), and a how-to-draw Scrat tutorial with the filmmakers.

A Blu-ray 3D version of the film was exclusively available with purchase of select Panasonic's television sets between May 16 and July 10, 2010, and was widely released on August 30, 2010. On September 21, 2010, a 3-D DVD was released as a two-disc set, with the first disc being the TrioScopics 3-D (green-magenta anaglyph) version and the second disc being the 2-D version.

Reception

Box office
The film earned $196.6 million in North America and $690.1 million in other territories for a worldwide total of $886.7 million against a budget of $90 million. Worldwide, it is the third-highest-grossing film of 2009, the highest-grossing animated film of 2009, the highest-grossing Ice Age film, the 14th-highest-grossing animated film of all time. It is also the highest-grossing animated film of 2009 worldwide. Ice Age: Dawn of the Dinosaurs also surpassed Finding Nemo to have the highest international gross for an animated film. The film grossed $218.4 million during the opening weekend, and was the highest-grossing opening for an animated film. It would hold that record for less than a decade until it was surpassed by Incredibles 2 in 2018.

North America
The film made $13,791,157 on its opening day in 4,099 theaters. It reached $41,690,382 on its first weekend, putting it at number 2 behind Transformers: Revenge of the Fallen, marking the lowest-grossing first weekend for the franchise, although it had a Wednesday release and therefore burned off attendance until the weekend. The film became 20th Century Fox's third-largest 2009 release in North America behind Avatar and Alvin and the Chipmunks: The Squeakquel. It is the third-highest-grossing animated feature of 2009. It heavily out-grossed its predecessor, Ice Age: The Meltdown which earned $195,330,621 three years before, to become the highest-grossing movie in the franchise, but it was behind the two first Ice Age movies in estimated attendance.

Other territories
On its opening weekend it earned $151.7 million, which is the biggest opening for an animated feature. Its highest-grossing market after North America was Germany ($82.2 million), followed by France and the Maghreb region ($69.2 million), and the UK, Ireland and Malta ($56.9 million). It was the highest-grossing animated film of the year in all major countries, except Spain and Australia.

Critical response
The site's critical consensus reads, "Ice Age: Dawn of the Dinosaurs boasts some excellent animation -- in particular, the dinosaurs are wonderfully realized -- but its story is tired and monotonous." On Metacritic, the film has a score of 50 out of 100 based on 25 critics, indicating "mixed or average reviews". Audiences polled by CinemaScore gave the film an average grade of "A−" on an A+ to F scale.

Roger Ebert gave the film three and a half stars out of four claiming that "Ice Age: Dawn of the Dinosaurs is the best of the three films about our friends in the inter-species herd of plucky prehistoric heroes. And it involves some of the best use of 3-D I've seen in an animated feature." Keith Phipps of The A.V. Club graded the film a C+ claiming the sequel "throws its commitment to the era away with movie number three, a ploy sure to anger Ice Age purists everywhere." Carrie Rickey of The Philadelphia Inquirer enjoyed the "film's animation art is Seuss-imaginative", but panned "the flatness of the story and indifferent voicework all the more obvious."

Accolades
The film was nominated in two categories at the 8th Visual Effects Society Awards, for "Outstanding Animation in an Animated Feature Motion Picture" and "Outstanding Animated Character in an Animated Feature Motion Picture."

Ice Age: Dawn of the Dinosaurs - The 4-D Experience
Ice Age: Dawn of the Dinosaurs - The 4-D Experience is a 14-minute 4-D film shown at various 4-D theaters over the world. It retells the condensed story of Ice Age: Dawn of the Dinosaurs with the help of 3-D projection and sensory effects, including moving seats, wind, mist, snow and scents. Produced by SimEx-Iwerks, The 4-D Experience premiered in May 2012, at the San Diego Zoo 4-D Theater. Since June 2012, it is being shown at the Roxy Theatre, at the Warner Bros. Movie World in Australia, and since July 2012, at the Shedd Aquarium's Phelps Auditorium in Chicago.

Video game

A tie-in video game was published by Activision. The game allows players to play as one of the film's characters, discovering the underground world of dinosaurs and solving puzzles through more than 15 levels.

Sequels

The fourth film, Ice Age: Continental Drift, was released in 3D on July 13, 2012. It was directed by Steve Martino and Mike Thurmeier—the first time without Carlos Saldanha. The film takes place a few years after the events of the third film, with Peaches in her teenage years. Scrat's never-ending pursuit of acorns has world-changing consequences, separating Manny, Sid and Diego from the rest, forcing them to stand up to a pirate gang, led by Captain Gutt.

The fifth film, Ice Age: Collision Course, was released in 3D on July 22, 2016.

See also
 List of animated feature-length films
 List of computer-animated films

References

External links

 
 
 
 

2009 films
Dawn of the Dinosaurs
2009 computer-animated films
2009 3D films
3D animated films
2000s American animated films
2000s pregnancy films
2009 fantasy films
2000s road movies
20th Century Fox films
20th Century Fox animated films
20th Century Fox Animation films
American 3D films
American computer-animated films
American road movies
American sequel films
Animated films about animals
Animated films about dinosaurs
Animated films about squirrels
Blue Sky Studios films
Films scored by John Powell
Films directed by Carlos Saldanha
Films produced by Lori Forte
Films with screenplays by Michael Berg
Films directed by Mike Thurmeier
2000s English-language films